Sara Grifi (born 26 September 1988) is an Italian professional racing cyclist.

See also
 Top Girls Fassa Bortolo

References

External links
 

1988 births
Living people
Italian female cyclists
People from Fermo
Sportspeople from the Province of Fermo
Cyclists from Marche